The 1983–84 Scottish Cup was the 99th staging of Scotland's most prestigious football knockout competition. The Cup was won by Aberdeen who defeated Celtic in the final.

First round

Second round

Replay

Second Replay

Third round

Replays

Second Replay

Fourth round

Quarter-finals

Replays

Semi-finals

Final

See also
1983–84 in Scottish football
1983–84 Scottish League Cup

Scottish Cup seasons
Scottish Cup, 1983-84
Scot